Carlos Felipe Álvarez (born August 3, 1983 in Barquisimeto, Lara, Venezuela), is a Venezuelan actor and model. He has participated in various television series and telenovelas of Radio Caracas Televisión.

Filmography

References

External links 

1983 births
Living people
Venezuelan male telenovela actors
Venezuelan male television actors
21st-century Venezuelan male actors